Lewis Peter Goldsworthy (born 8 January 2001) is an English cricketer who plays for Somerset.

Career
Goldsworthy attended Millfield School from Sixth form. Goldsworthy has played for Camborne Cricket Club in Cornwall alongside his brother Jamie Goldsworthy.

Goldsworthy made his Twenty20 debut on 16 September 2020, for Somerset in the 2020 t20 Blast. Prior to his Twenty20 debut, he was named in England's squad for the 2020 Under-19 Cricket World Cup. He made his first-class debut on 29 April 2021, for Somerset in the 2021 County Championship. He made his List A debut on 25 July 2021, for Somerset in the 2021 Royal London One-Day Cup.

In July 2022, in the 2022 County Championship match against Lancashire, Goldsworthy scored his maiden century in first-class cricket.

References

External links
 

2001 births
Living people
English cricketers
Cornwall cricketers
Somerset cricketers
People from Camborne
Place of birth missing (living people)
People educated at Millfield